is a 2018 Japanese superhero  film in the Movie War line of the Kamen Rider Series. It serves as a crossover between the television series Kamen Rider Zi-O and Kamen Rider Build and is the third film of the Generations series. Aside the casts of Zi-O and Build, the casts of Kamen Rider Den-O and Kamen Rider W also participate, as well as some lead actors from other Kamen Rider Series performing voice-only cameos. The film was released nationally in Japan on December 22, 2018. This is the last Heisei-era Kamen Rider movie, released four months before the 2019 Japanese imperial transition.

Plot
Sougo Tokiwa/Kamen Rider Zi-O and Sento Kiryu/Kamen Rider Build must join forces with all the Kamen Riders of the Heisei era against Tid, a Super Time Jacker who intends to erase the entire history of Heisei Kamen Riders.

Cast
Zi-O cast
: 
: 
: 
: 
: 
: 
Classmate: 

Build cast
: 
: 
: 
: 
: 

Returning cast
: 
: 
: 

Heisei Generations Forever cast
: 
: 
: 
Ataru's father: 
Ataru's mother: 
Young Ataru:

Voiceover roles
: 
: 
: 
: 
: 
: 
: 
: 
: 
:

Theme song

Arrangement: Daisuke Asakura
A medley of the opening theme songs from all 20 Heisei Kamen Rider television series from Kamen Rider Kuuga to Kamen Rider Zi-O.

Reception
Kamen Rider Heisei Generations Forever grossed $12,587,899 at the box office.

References

External links

2010s Kamen Rider films
Films scored by Kenji Kawai
Films scored by Toshihiko Sahashi
2010s Japanese films
2010s Japanese-language films